Akhand Path The continuous and uninterrupted recitation of Sri Guru Guru Granth Sahib Ji is known as Akhand Path Sahib.

Sikhism
The continuous nonstop recitation of all the verses in the Guru Granth Sahib from the beginning to the end, in 31 Ragas as specified, in all 1430 pages, lasts more than 48 hours by a team of readers.

Nearby, over a container of water a coconut is kept wrapped in saffron or white cloth. A ghee lamp is also kept burning. This ritual is considered very holy and is said to bring peace and solace to the participants and the passive listeners of the recital. During the reading it is tradition for langar (or communal food) to be available at all times, thus requiring the continual service and dedication of those in whose honour the Akhand Path is being held. By definition, a gurdwara is a space that has been appropriately dedicated to receive and house the Sikh scriptures. Gurdwaras play an important traditional role in Sikh society, as they provide food and rest to all visitors, and thus have ... To commemorate milestone events such as births, deaths, and weddings, Sikh Americans might arrange for ... the “Holy Book [which is] Guru,” a practice known as Akhand Path, which takes approximately two full days and nights in its entirety.

Some Gurdwaras hold a weekly Akhand Path and this gives the congregation (Sadh Sangat) a beautiful opportunity to establish a close relationship with the Guru - the Granth and the communion that provides the chance to carry out volunteer work (Seva) thus obtaining the blessing of the Guru Granth Sahib for the whole of the communion.

It is said that when Guru Gobind Singh had completed the writing of the Guru Granth Sahib, he had five members of the congregation (Sadh Sangat) who chanted the completed Granth to him nonstop, for more than two days and nights. He stood there and listened to the entire Guru Granth Sahib without having any sleep whatsoever. People brought him water for his bath and for his meals where he stood. This was the first Akhand Path. The second Akhand Path was in Nanded after Guru Gobind Singh sent Banda Singh Bahadur to Punjab. The Akhand Pathees (reciters of the Granth) were Bhai Gurbaksh Singh, Baba Deep Singh, Bhai Dharam Singh (of Panj Piaray), Bhai Santokh Singh, and Bhai Hari Singh (who used to write the daily diary of Guru Gobind Singh). Before giving the Guruship to the Guru Granth Sahib (then called the Adi Granth) the Guru held this Akhand Path and then proclaimed the Adi Granth as the perpetual Guru of the Sikhs.

Following this example, the Sikhs started the tradition of dedicating Akhand Paths to various activities. Before battles, the Sikhs would listen to an Akhand Path and then prepare for battle. An Akhand Path was arranged before the Sikhs set out to rescue 18,000 indigenous women captured by the Moghuls and had taken them as slaves.

In 1742, when Sikhs were in the jungles of Punjab, one Sikh woman warrior named Bibi Sundari, requested just before she died (due to the wounds inflicted in battle) to have an Akhand Path arranged for her. She lay there next to the Guru Granth Sahib and listened to the full recitation of this Path.  After kirtan, Ardas and Hukam, she received the Karah Prashad, uttered "Waheguru ji ka Khalsa, Waheguru ji ki Fateh" breathing her last. Thus began the tradition of rendering an Akhand Path within 48 hours.

If the Akhand Path is to be recited in Gurmukhi, then it must be completed within 48 hours, without recitation in 31 Ragas as specified. If it is to be done in English, it will take more than 72 hours to complete.

During an Akhand Path, if a Hukam is taken at the end of a program, the Pathee (person reading the Path) reads the Gurbani that they have arrived at in the regular course of reading. They may slow down and read it clearly. In this case, the first and last two lines are not repeated. When the Pathee reaches the end of the Hukam, they continue in the reading of the Akhand Path.

Akhand Path is supposed to be read loudly, clearly, and correctly.

References

Sikh terminology